Kailasanathar Temple, Tirumetrazhigai, is a Siva temple near Patteeswaram in Thanjavur District in Tamil Nadu (India).

Vaippu Sthalam
It is one of the shrines of the Vaippu Sthalams sung by Tamil Saivite Nayanar Sundarar.

Presiding deity
The presiding deity is known as Kailasanathar. His consort is known as Sabalanayagi.

Shrines
In front of the sanctum santorum Surya, Chandikesvarar, Vinayaka, Bairava and Sabalayanagi are found. Nandhi and balipeeta are found in front of the temple. Sculptures are found in the kosta.

References

External links
 மூவர் தேவார வைப்புத்தலங்கள், ARaimERRaLi, Sl.No.21 of 139 temples
 Shiva Temples, தேவார வைப்புத்தலங்கள், ஆறைமேற்றளி, Sl.No.14 of 133 temples, page1

Photogallery

Hindu temples in Thanjavur district
Shiva temples in Thanjavur district
Padal Petra Stalam